Big Muddy Creek is a stream in Harrison and Gentry counties of northwestern Missouri. It is a tributary of the East Fork of the Grand River.

The stream flows to the southeast passing one mile west of the community of Washington Center then enters the northeast corner of Gentry County where it passes just south of Siloam Springs.

References

Rivers of Missouri
Rivers of Gentry County, Missouri
Rivers of Harrison County, Missouri